Eulepidotis reticulata is a moth of the family Erebidae first described by Constant Bar in 1876. It is found in the Neotropics, including French Guiana, Suriname and Guyana.

References

Moths described in 1876
reticulata